Godfrey Makumbi (15 December 1962 - 31 May 2015) was an Anglican bishop who served in Uganda: he was Bishop of West Buganda from 2011 until his death in May 2015.

Makumbi was born in  Nansana and educated at Makerere University and the University of Southampton. He was a teacher as well as a priest

References

21st-century Anglican bishops in Uganda
2015 deaths
Anglican bishops of West Buganda
1962 births
Ugandan educators
Makerere University alumni
Alumni of the University of Southampton